Bašanija is a naselje (settlement) in the municipality of Umag, Istria County, Croatia. According to the 2011 census, it had 256 inhabitants. It is the westernmost point of Croatia.

References

Populated places in Istria County